Santiago Montoya Muñoz (born 15 September 1991) is a Colombian footballer who plays for F.C. Motagua. He primarily plays as a left winger.

Club career

Early career
Born in Medellín, Montoya is a product of the youth setup led by Atlético Nacional. Due to the high amount of competition there was at the Colombian club, Montoya decided to migrate to Argentina in search of new opportunities. Despite losing faith in playing for Nacional, Montoya regarded himself as a player with high potential. Eventually, that would lead him to try out for All Boys and finally sign with the club in 2011.

All Boys
Montoya made his debut for All Boys on 6 October 2012 in a game against San Martín for the 2012 Apertura tournament. He was substituted on in the second half for Francisco Martínez. He noticeably netted a goal from a free kick in the 2012–13 Copa Argentina match against Brown de Adrogué. On 3 March 2012, he scored his first goal in the aperatura in a 2-1 away loss against Tigre.

Vasco da Gama
In the month of June 2013, it was announced that Montoya had joined Vasco da Gama for a fee of $1.5 million.

Honours
Vasco da Gama
Campeonato Carioca: 2015

References

External links

1991 births
Living people
Colombian footballers
Colombia international footballers
Colombian expatriate footballers
All Boys footballers
CR Vasco da Gama players
Vitória S.C. players
Deportes Tolima footballers
Millonarios F.C. players
Argentine Primera División players
Categoría Primera A players
Campeonato Brasileiro Série A players
Campeonato Brasileiro Série B players
Primeira Liga players
Expatriate footballers in Argentina
Expatriate footballers in Brazil
Expatriate footballers in Portugal
Association football midfielders
Footballers from Medellín
Atlético Bucaramanga footballers
Deportivo Pereira footballers